The following is a list of most watched Brazil television broadcasts of 2019. Traditionally, telenovelas dominate the weekly ratings of Brazil's television seasons, and in 2019 was no different. Rede Globo maintains its hegemony and monopoly of the Brazilian public's preference every year. Only two different genres reached the top position in the weekly audience in addition to telenovelas: news program and broadcast of association football matches. The 2019 Copa America game between Brazil and Argentina was the most watched television broadcast of the year in the country, with an estimated audience of 44 million viewers, being closely followed by the last week of "A Dona do Pedaço", which was watched by 42 million viewers.

In São Paulo, the largest city in Brazil, the highest rating of the year was from the last week of "A Dona do Pedaço": 43.2 points; while in Rio de Janeiro, the Copa Libertadores semifinal match between Flamengo and Grêmio registered a rating of 51 points.

Most watched by week

See also 

 Television in Brazil
 List of most watched Brazil television broadcasts of 2020

References

Television in Brazil
Brazilian television-related lists
2019 in Brazilian television